Biarum is a genus of flowering plants in the family Araceae.  It is composed of plants that are native to the Middle East, southern Europe (Spain, Portugal, Italy, Balkans), and North Africa. Biarum are often found growing in rock crevices and graveled soil composed largely of limestone.

The leaves of Biarum can be similar to grass or even oval. Their corms are spherical and the plants as a whole tend to be small. Many Biarum are quite similar in appearance to Arums. To flower Biarum required a dry rest period during summer. Their inflorescence tend to grow close to the ground and produce an extremely intense and unpleasant odor. The fruits produced tend to be camouflaged so as to resemble stones. It's not entirely known how they are dispersed, but one idea is that they have evolved to avoid seed dispersal since doing so in such inhospitable environments might not be conducive to its reproduction.

Species
Biarum aleppicum J.Thiébaut - Syria
Biarum angustatum (Hook.f.) N.E.Br. - Syria, Israel
Biarum auraniticum Mouterde - Syria
Biarum bovei Blume - Turkey, Syria, Lebanon, Israel, Jordan, Iraq, Iran
Biarum carduchorum (Schott) Engl. - Turkey, Syria, Lebanon, Israel, Jordan, Iraq, Iran
Biarum carratracense (Willk.) Font Quer - southern Spain
Biarum crispulum (Schott) Engl. - Turkey, Syria
Biarum davisii Turrill - Crete
Biarum dispar (Schott) Talavera - southern Spain, Sardinia, Algeria, Libya, Tunisia, Morocco 
Biarum ditschianum Bogner & P.C.Boyce - Turkey, Kastellorizo Island in Greece
Biarum eximium (Schott & Kotschy) Engl. - Turkey, Jordan
Biarum fraasianum (Schott) Nyman - Greece
Biarum kotschyi (Schott) B.Mathew ex Riedl - Turkey
Biarum marmarisense (P.C.Boyce) P.C.Boyce - Turkey, Symi Island in Greece
Biarum mendax P.C.Boyce - southern Spain, Alto Alentejo Province in Portugal
Biarum olivieri Blume - Egypt, Israel
Biarum pyrami (Schott) Engl.  - Turkey, Syria, Lebanon, Israel, Jordan
Biarum rhopalospadix K.Koch - Greece
Biarum straussii Engl. - Iran, Iraq
Biarum syriacum (Spreng.) Riedl - Turkey, Syria
Biarum tenuifolium (L.) Schott - Morocco, Portugal, Spain, Italy, Greece, Albania, Yugoslavia, Turkey

References

Aroideae
Araceae genera